Dušan Nulíček (born 2 June 1988) is a Czech football forward who currently plays for Loko Vltavín.

References

External links
 
 
 

1988 births
Living people
Czech footballers
Czech expatriate footballers
Czech Republic youth international footballers
Czech First League players
FK Jablonec players
FK Čáslav players
Loko Vltavín players
S.S. Fidelis Andria 1928 players
FC DAC 1904 Dunajská Streda players
Expatriate footballers in Italy
Expatriate footballers in Slovakia
Czech expatriate sportspeople in Italy
Czech expatriate sportspeople in Slovakia
Association football forwards
Sportspeople from Jablonec nad Nisou